Allobaculum is a Gram-positive, non-spore-forming bacterial, strictly anaerobic and non-motile genus from the family of Erysipelotrichidae, with one known species (Allobaculum stercoricanis).

See also
 List of bacterial orders
 List of bacteria genera

References

Further reading 
 

Erysipelotrichia
Monotypic bacteria genera
Bacteria genera